The 1978–79 Home Counties League season was the first in the history of the Combined Counties Football League, a football competition in England. This was the only season in which the "Home Counties League" name was used before the league was renamed as the Combined Counties League.

There was one division of thirteen clubs, won by British Aerospace (Weybridge).

Constitution and league table

The league consisted of thirteen clubs, nine of which came from the Surrey Senior League:
Ash United
British Aerospace (Weybridge)
Chessington United
Clarion
Cobham
Lion Sports
Malden Town
Sheerwater
Westfield
Four other teams also joined the league:
Guildford & Worplesdon 
Hartley Wintney
Lightwater
Yateley Town

League table

References

External links
 Combined Counties League Official Site

1978-79
1978–79 in English football leagues